Syed Amir Haider Kamal Naqvi (17 January 1918 – 11 February 1993), popularly known as Kamal Amrohi, was an Indian film director and screenwriter. He was also an Urdu and Hindi poet.

His Hindi films include Mahal (1949), Pakeezah (1972) and Razia Sultan (1983). He established Kamal Pictures (Mahal Films) in 1953 and Kamalistan Studio in Bombay in 1958.

Early life
Kamal Amrohi was born in Amroha, United Provinces in British India (present-day Uttar Pradesh) and later took on the name Kamal Amrohi (or Amrohvi). He was a first cousin to Pakistani writers Jaun Elia and Rais Amrohvi.

Career
In 1938, he left Amroha to study in Lahore, now part of Pakistan, where singer K. L. Saigal discovered him and took him to Mumbai (Bombay) to work for Sohrab Modi's Minerva Movietone film company, where he started his career working on films like Jailor (1938), Pukar (1939), Bharosa (1940), A. R. Kardar's film (Shahjehan 1946). He made his debut as a director in 1949, with Mahal, starring Madhubala and Ashok Kumar, which was a musical hit, with songs by Lata Mangeshkar and Rajkumari Dubey.

He directed only four films; of these were Mahal (1949) for Bombay Talkies, Daaera (1953) with Meena Kumari and Nasir Khan, Pakeezah, which was conceived in 1958 but was not brought to the screen until 1972. He also wrote the screenplay, lyrics and produced the latter. Film Pakeezah (1972) has been called one of the extraordinary musical melodramas ever made in India, although flawed but noble. Meena Kumari herself, in her public comments to the press, after seeing the movie, said that it was Kamal Amrohi's tribute to her. This was followed by Razia Sultan (1983), his last film. Though, he started a film, Majnoon with Rajesh Khanna and Rakhee Gulzar as leads, however the film got shelved.

He wrote scripts for the movies made by Sohrab Modi, Abdul Rashid Kardar and K. Asif. He was one of the four dialogue writers for the latter's famous 1960 movie, Mughal-e-Azam, for which he won the Filmfare Award.

As a director, he developed a style that combined a stylised direction with minimalist performances. This style was different from the one with expressive acting that was common in Indian cinema of his period.

In 1958, he started Kamaal Studios for his banner Mahal Films, though it closed down after three years and later changed hands to become Natraj Studios.

It was mentioned that the last movie he wanted to make was called Aakhri Mughal. He had written a substantial portion of the script. But it went into oblivion after his death. Noted film maker J P Dutta was to revive the film in the late 1990s which was supposed to have been Abhishekh Bachchan's debut movie. But later Dutta scrapped the project. He was again planning to revive the film in 2007 after the debacle of his costume drama Umrao Jaan (2006) remake from the cult film from the 1980s.

Personal life
Amrohi married four times: His first wife was Bilkis Bano (who was a maid to Nargis's mother, Jaddan Bai). After her death, he married Sayeda Al-Zehra Mehmoodi, daughter of Jamal Hasan. She remained his senior wife throughout his marriage to Meena Kumari, and died on 9 April 1982. He met Meena Kumari during the filming of Tamasha. Veteran actor Ashok Kumar introduced them. They fell in love and married on 14 February 1952, on Valentine's Day in a much private ceremony. Only Amrohi's friend Baaqar Ali and Meena Kumari's younger sister Madhu were aware of this development.

The couple then made Daera (1953 film), a film based on their love story, however the movie tanked at the box office. During the filming of Azaad in 1954, both of them planned another movie, Pakeezah. The film went on studio floors by 1956, but as the craze of colour films increased, particularly after the release of Mother India (1957), the black & white scenes were re-shot to colour sequences. After the release of Guru Dutt's classic Kaagaz Ke Phool (1959 film) which marked the arrival of Cinemascope technique, the film was again shot, this time in Cinemascope. By the 1960s, Meena Kumari was at the peak of her career which caused tensions between the couple and ultimately led to a mutual separation in March 1964. Film Pakeezah got shelved. In March 1969, the film was revived with an ill Meena Kumari, (due to her alcoholism) in the lead. They lived together for a total of 11 years. Raaj Kumar was roped in, as by that time, Ashok Kumar- the original lead was too old to portray the hero of the film.

Pakeezah was released on 4 February 1972, 14 years after it first began. Unfortunately, it received a lukewarm response from the critics. Although the film received warm reception from the audience, it was Meena Kumari's untimely death on 31 March 1972 which acted as an ultimate push and made it one of the top grossers of that year. The film is now considered as a cult classic and has a status much similar to K. Asif's 1960 magnum opus, Mughal-E-Azam.

Kamal Amrohi got married for the fourth time with his physician. During his last years, he used to regularly visit the hospital for minor ailments. There he met his fourth wife, who was actually his doctor. After the death of Mehmoodi in 1982, Amrohi felt lonely and in order to avoid being a burden on his children, he decided to get married, drawing sharp reactions from the media.
 
Kamal Amrohi had three children with Mehmoodie: two sons, Shandaar and Taajdaar, both of whom worked with him in Razia Sultan, and a daughter, Rukhsar Amrohi. He had no children with Bilkis Bano, Meena Kumari and his fourth wife. Shandaar died on 21 August 2011 in Goa. He was laid to rest in Mumbai the following day.

Kamal Amrohi Studios
Kamal Amrohi Studios (Kamalistan Studios) was established in 1958, spread over 15 acre, it is situated in Jogeshwari East, off Jogeshwari – Vikhroli Link Road in Mumbai. It continues to run, managed by Amrohi's son and daughter, Tajdar Amrohi & Rukhsar Amrohi; despite 2010 news reports of it being sold, and continued litigation thereafter. Over the years, it has been venues of films like Razia Sultan (1983) Kamal Amrohi's last film as a director, Amar Akbar Anthony (1977) and Kaalia (1981),  Khalnayak (1993), Koyla (1997), and recently the first schedule of film, Dabangg 2 was shot there in 2012, apart from the television shows are also shot at the complex.

Death and legacy

Amrohi died on 11 February 1993 in Mumbai, twenty one years after his wife Meena Kumari's death and ten years after making his last film, Razia Sultan (1983). He was buried next to Meena Kumari in Rehmatabad Qabristan, an Indian-Iranian graveyard in Mumbai.

Six days after his death, UK daily The Independent, published a obituary for Kamal Amrohi, calling him Moghul-like and presiding over Hindi film industry for over five decades. 

Kamal Amrohi's only daughter from his second wife, Mehmoodie, Rukhsaar Amrohi gave a newspaper interview describing her version of life-events, which she witnessed, between her father Kamal Amrohi and Meena Kumari.

In February 2022, Music label Saregama and actor Bilal Amrohi (grandson of Kamal Amrohi) announced a web series on the love story of Amrohi and Meena Kumari against the backdrop of making of the film Pakeezah. The series which will be helmed by Yoodlee films is expected to go on floors in 2023.

Filmography

Soundtrack
1998 Such a Long Journey (writer: "Thare Rahiyo")

Awards and recognition
 1961: Filmfare Award for Best Dialogue: Mughal-e-Azam (1960)
 1972: Nominated for Filmfare Award for Best Director for film Pakeezah (1972).

References

External links

  website
 Filmography of Kamal Amrohi on Complete Index To World Film (CITWF) website

1918 births
1993 deaths
Urdu-language film directors
Indian male screenwriters
Indian Shia Muslims
People from Amroha
Hindi-language film directors
20th-century Indian film directors
Film directors from Uttar Pradesh
20th-century Indian screenwriters
Indian National Congress politicians from Uttar Pradesh
20th-century Indian male writers